The 2018–19 season was Club Brugge's 127th season in existence and the club's 59th consecutive season in the top flight of Belgian football.

Players

First-team squad

Out on loan

Competitions

Belgian First Division A

League table
Regular season

Championship play-offs

Belgian Cup

Belgian Super Cup

UEFA Champions League

UEFA Europa League

Statistics

Squad appearances and goals
Last updated on May 2019.

|-
! colspan=16 style=background:#dcdcdc; text-align:center|Goalkeepers

|-
! colspan=16 style=background:#dcdcdc; text-align:center|Defenders

|-
! colspan=16 style=background:#dcdcdc; text-align:center|Midfielders

|-
! colspan=16 style=background:#dcdcdc; text-align:center|Forwards

|-
! colspan=16 style=background:#dcdcdc; text-align:center|Players who have made an appearance this season but have left the club

|}

References

External links

Club Brugge KV seasons
Club Brugge KV
Brugge KV